Stefano Borchi (born 9 March 1987) is an Italian racing cyclist. He rode at the 2013 UCI Road World Championships.

Major results
2008
 5th Time trial, UCI Road World Under–23 Championships
2009
 5th Memorial Davide Fardelli
2013
 1st Stage 8 Vuelta a Venezuela

References

External links
 

1987 births
Living people
Italian male cyclists
People from Prato
Sportspeople from the Province of Prato
Cyclists from Tuscany